Samuel Bond (died 1673) was an English academic, lawyer and politician who sat in the House of Commons in 1659.

Bond was the son of Denis Bond of Dorset who was a Parliamentarian MP and his second wife Lucy Lawrence. He matriculated from St Catharine's College, Cambridge at Michaelmas 1639 and was awarded BA in 1642. He was admitted at Inner Temple in  1642. In 1646 he was awarded  MA at Cambridge and became a Fellow of Trinity Hall, Cambridge until  1649. He was called to the bar in 1648.

In 1659, Bond was elected Member of Parliament for Poole in the Third Protectorate Parliament. He was elected MP for Weymouth and Melcombe Regis in 1660 for the Convention Parliament but was involved in a double return and his election was declared void on 5 May 1660. He became Recorder of Weymouth and Melcombe Regis.
 
Bond died in 1673 and was buried at Dorchester on 31 May. He was the brother of Nathaniel Bond and half-brother of John Bond.

References

Year of birth missing
1673 deaths
Alumni of St Catharine's College, Cambridge
Members of the Inner Temple
Fellows of Trinity Hall, Cambridge
People from Poole
17th-century English lawyers
English MPs 1659